Zhucun station may refer to:
Zhucun station (Shenzhen Metro), station of Line 4 (Shenzhen Metro).
, station of Line 21 (Guangzhou Metro).